Margaret Sheehan Blodgett (October 13, 1897 – June 16, 1987) was an American attorney. She was the third woman to be admitted to the New Hampshire Bar Association.

Early life and education
Blodgett was born in Manchester, New Hampshire, on October 13, 1897. She went to Mount Saint Mary School in Hooksett, New Hampshire, before earning her Bachelor of Arts from Trinity College in Washington, D.C. She studied law at Portia Law School (now New England Law Boston) and graduated in 1925.

Legal career
Blodgett was honored as an "unsung heroine" by the New Hampshire Commission on the Status of Women in 1986.

See also
 List of first women lawyers and judges in New Hampshire

References

1897 births
1987 deaths
20th-century American women lawyers
People from Manchester, New Hampshire
New Hampshire lawyers
Trinity Washington University alumni
New England Law Boston alumni
20th-century American lawyers